The Shire of Mornington was a local government area about  south of Melbourne, the state capital of Victoria, Australia, encompassing the western extremity of the Mornington Peninsula. The shire covered an area of  immediately to the south of Frankston, and existed from 1860 until 1994.

History

The Mount Eliza Road District (centred on Frankston) was created on 6 November 1860, and became a shire on 24 November 1871. On 31 May 1893, it was renamed the Shire of Frankston and Hastings, while its western riding was severed and named New Mornington, to avoid confusion with the previous entity. On 19 January 1894, it was renamed the Shire of Mornington.

On 15 December 1994, the Shire of Mornington was abolished, and along with the Shires of Shire of Flinders and Hastings, and parts of the City of Frankston, was merged into the newly created Shire of Mornington Peninsula. The Age reported in July 1994 that the result had been supported by Hastings and Mornington councils from the beginning, but opposed by Flinders, which wanted to merge with the southern coastal section of Hastings.

Council formerly met at the Shire Hall, at Queen Street and Vancouver Street, Mornington. The facility is used today as a civic centre and library by the Shire of Mornington Peninsula.

Wards

The Shire of Mornington was divided into four ridings, each of which elected three councillors:
 Mornington North Riding
 Mornington South Riding
 Mount Eliza Riding
 Mount Martha Riding

Suburbs and localities
 Moorooduc (shared with the Shire of Hastings)
 Mornington*
 Mount Eliza (shared with the City of Frankston)
 Mount Martha

* Council seat.

Population

* Estimate in the 1958 Victorian Year Book.

References

External links
 Victorian Places - Mornington Shire

Mornington
Mornington Peninsula
1893 establishments in Australia
1994 disestablishments in Australia